The 1979 SANFL Grand Final was an Australian rules football competition. Port Adelaide beat  by 63 to 32. There was a strong breeze, and all goals were scored at the same end.

As of 2022, this is South Adelaide's last Grand Final appearance.

References 

SANFL Grand Finals
SANFL Grand Final, 1979